Christophe Arciero (born in France) is a French motorcycle racer.

Career statistics

Grand Prix motorcycle racing

By season

Races by year

References

External links

Living people
French motorcycle racers
Moto3 World Championship riders
Place of birth missing (living people)
Year of birth missing (living people)